Ansonia siamensis is a species of toad in the family Bufonidae. It is endemic to the Khao Chong Mountains of peninsular Thailand. Its natural habitats are subtropical or tropical moist lowland forests and rivers.

References

siamensis
Endemic fauna of Thailand
Taxonomy articles created by Polbot
Amphibians described in 1985